Conon Bridge is a railway station on the Far North and Kyle of Lochalsh Lines, which serves the villages of Conon Bridge and Maryburgh in the Scottish Highlands. Initially known as Conon, it originally closed in 1960 and reopened on 8 February 2013.

History

Original station 
The original railway station (then named just Conon) was opened by Inverness and Ross-shire Railway on 11 June 1862 and closed on 13 June 1960. The original station had two platforms and was the junction with the partially constructed Cromarty and Dingwall Light Railway.

2013 reopening 
The rebuilt station was projected to open by 2012 as Conon Bridge. In March 2012, Network Rail revealed that agreement had been reached with the Highlands and Islands Transport Partnership for it to provide £100,000 towards the construction of a single four-carriage platform at the station site.

In September 2012, Scottish Government Transport Minister Keith Brown announced that a new station, expected to cost £600,000, would be built in time for a February 2013 opening, in time to help relieve traffic during the delayed £18 million pound resurfacing works to be carried out on the Kessock Bridge.

Construction was begun in November 2012 by Network Rail. A single platform around 15 metres long (similar to that at nearby Beauly railway station) was provided, together with a new waiting shelter, passenger information systems, cycle racks and lockers and a new car park, wider road access and enhanced street lighting. The project was supported by Highland Council, HiTRANS, Network Rail and First ScotRail. It reopened as scheduled and on budget on 8 February 2013. In the month following the station's opening, more than 2,000 journeys were made to or from it. According to Minister for Transport Keith Brown, the numbers "show that it was an extremely worthwhile investment".

Facilities 
The station has only basic facilities, these being a small waiting shelter, a car park, bike racks and a help point. As there are no facilities to purchase tickets, passengers must buy one in advance, or from the guard on the train.

Platform layout 
The station has a single platform which is long enough for a one-coach train.

Passenger volume 

The statistics cover twelve month periods that start in April.

Services
As of the December 2021 timetable, on weekdays and Saturdays, the station sees 11 trains northbound (3 to Wick via Thurso, 4 to Kyle of Lochalsh, 1 to Dingwall, 1 to Invergordon, 1 to Ardgay and 1 to Tain), and 13 trains southbound to Inverness. On Sundays, the station sees 6 trains northbound (1 to Wick, 1 to Kyle of Lochalsh, 1 to Invergordon and 3 to Tain), and 6 trains southbound.

References

Bibliography

External links

Railway stations in Highland (council area)
Former Highland Railway stations
Railway stations in Great Britain opened in 1862
Railway stations in Great Britain closed in 1960
Railway stations in Great Britain opened in 2013
Reopened railway stations in Great Britain
Railway stations served by ScotRail
1862 establishments in Scotland